399th may refer to:

399th Bombardment Group, inactive United States Air Force unit
399th Bombardment Squadron or 99th Air Refueling Squadron, part of the 6th Air Mobility Wing at Birmingham Air National Guard Base, Alabama
399th Fighter Squadron or 57th Weather Reconnaissance Squadron, inactive United States Air Force Reserve squadron

See also
399 (number)
399, the year 399 (CCCXCIX) of the Julian calendar
399 BC